The  occurred approximately 42 km (26 mi) north-northeast of Shizuoka City at 22:31 JST, 15 March 2011. The magnitude was  6.0 or  6.4, and the depth was 9 km (5.6 mi). The hypocenter of this earthquake is thought to have been near the presumed location of the magma chamber of Mount Fuji. It may have been a triggered earthquake caused by the Tohoku earthquake, which occurred four days earlier, on 11 March 2011. It was sinistral strike-slip fault earthquake. It had a maximum JMA intensity of Shindo 6+ (Fujinomiya) or VIII (Severe) on the Mercalli intensity scale. The earthquake left 80 people injured, and caused some power outages.

See also
List of earthquakes in 2011
List of earthquakes in Japan

References

External links
 2011年3月15日の静岡県東部の地震 (M6.4) について - 気象庁 地震予知情報課

March 2011 events in Japan
2011 earthquakes
Earthquakes in Japan
Earthquakes of the Heisei period
2011 disasters in Japan